John T. Halloran (January 10, 1916January 24, 1997) was an American composer and choral director. He died at 81 of a stroke.

Biography

Early life
Born in Rock Rapids, Iowa in 1916, Halloran earned degrees in music from Morningside College in Sioux City, Iowa, and Northwestern University.

Choral and pop culture involvement
He sang with a male quartet called the Cadets on several Chicago-based radio shows, including "The Breakfast Club With Don MacNeil." He later formed the Jack Halloran Quartet, which appeared on the television programs "Dave Garroway at Large" and "The Pat Buttram Show." Relocating to Hollywood, Halloran became a choral director for films, records and television, working with such entertainers as Roy Rogers, Pat Boone, Ray Charles, Frank Sinatra and Dean Martin. He landed the job as choral director and arranger on The Dean Martin Show while working with the singer on his recording of "Volare." Halloran also organized the Jack Halloran Singers, which performed throughout Southern California.

In 1957, Halloran arranged and recorded the current version of the now-popular Christmas song The Little Drummer Boy (at the time, titled Carol of the Drum) for the Dot Records album Christmas Is A-Comin'''. However, the recording was not released as a single that year. In response to this, Dot producer Henry Onorati, who left Dot to become the new head of 20th Century Fox Records in 1958, introduced the song to Harry Simeone. When 20th Century Fox Records contracted with Simeone to make a Christmas album, Simeone hired many of the same singers that had sung in Halloran's version and made a near-identical recording with his newly created Harry Simeone Chorale. It was released as a single in 1958, and later on the album, Sing We Now of Christmas. This version became very successful, and has since become a popular Christmas song. The only difference between Simeone's version and Halloran's version, was that Simeone's contained finger cymbals, and had been retitled The Little Drummer Boy.  Simeone and Onorati claimed and received joint composition credits along with Katherine Kennicott Davis, although the two did not actually compose, write, or arrange it. Halloran never received a writing credit for the song, something his family disagrees with.Estrella, E. (8 February 2019). How the 'Little Drummer Boy' Christmas Carol Came to Be. Retrieved from https://web.archive.org/web/20191123173121/https://www.liveabout.com/little-drummer-boy-history-2456078 The song has since been covered by hundreds of artists, including multiple re-recordings by Simeone.

Halloran directed the orchestra and chorus for Bing Crosby's 1959 LP Join Bing and Sing Along. He directed the chorus for Bing's 1962 LPs On the Happy Side and I Wish You a Merry Christmas and Bing's 1971 LP A Time to Be Jolly.  He was also a member of the Ray Conniff Singers, appearing on such albums as Speak to Me of Love'' (Columbia, 1963).

Halloran was also a former local president of the American Federation of Television and Radio Artists.

Arrangements and compositions
America the Beautiful
Camptown Races
Christmas Is a Comin'
Little David, Play on Your Harp
Nelly Bly
Pat-A-Pan (Burgundian carol)
Witness

Witness
Witness (1986) was first released in an a cappella setting for 8-part mixed voices, and within months had sold over 30,000 copies. The following year it topped 50,000 and continued to climb. Today it remains a top seller and an industry standard. Veteran arranger Dick Bolks has revoiced and edited Halloran's setting into an SATB edition with optional accompaniment.

References

American male composers
1916 births
1997 deaths
People from Rock Rapids, Iowa
Morningside University alumni
Bienen School of Music alumni
20th-century American composers
20th-century American male musicians
Northwestern University alumni